An exercise machine is any machine used for physical exercise. These range from simple spring-like devices to computerized electromechanical devices to recirculating-stream swimming pools. Most exercise machines incorporate an ergometer. An ergometer is an apparatus for measuring the work a person exerts while exercising as used in training or cardiac stress tests or other medical tests.

Resistance machines

Weight machines 

Weight machines use gravity as the primary source of resistance, and a combination of simple machines to convey that resistance, to the person using the machine. Each of the simple machines (pulley, lever, wheel, incline) changes the mechanical advantage of the overall machine relative to the weight.

Other kinds of resistance machines
 Friction machines
 Spring-loaded machines (such as Bowflex)
 Fan-loaded machines
 Fluid-loaded machines
 Bullworker
 Hydraulic equipment
 Whole body vibration
 Outdoor gym
 Pneumatic exercise equipment
 Treadmill

Endless-path machines

Stationary bicycles
 Exercise bicycle

Running/walking machines
Treadmill
Elliptical trainer

Elliptical machines
Ellipticals (elliptical machines) are a combination of stair-climbing and a treadmill. Generally it contains two tracks upon which the user stands. Users describe an elliptical motion (hence the machine name) while walking or jogging. Some ellipticals have magnetic resistance controls that add difficulty to doing the motion.

Glider machines
This machine allows the user to stand on two separate foot pedals and use their own muscles to create the movement. The stabilized movement can be likened to that of a "swing set" for each leg.

Climbing machines
Also named stair-climbing machines, they work the user's legs as he/she pumps pedals up and down, much like climbing stairs. Some climbing machines have handles to push and pull to exercise the whole body.

Rowing machines
Rowing machines, also named rowers, simulate the body movements of using a rowing boat.

See also
Chin-up bar
Exercise equipment
Sports medicine
Rehabilitation
Statics

Exercise equipment
Strength training